Bartnick is a surname, being a Germanized or Americanized form of the Polish surname Bartnik, meaning "bee keeper". Notable people with the surname include:

Günther Bartnick (born 1949), German retired biathlete
Joe Bartnick, American comedian, actor, and writer

See also
Bartnik
Bortnick